Winslow State Park is a public recreation area located on the northwest slope of Mount Kearsarge in Wilmot, New Hampshire. The state park features a picnic area on an  plateau with views of the White Mountains to the north. A  foot trail (the Winslow Trail) leads from the picnic area to the summit of Mount Kearsarge. A  trail (the Barlow Trail) offers a loop possibility.

History
The park is named after a 19th-century hotel, Winslow House, which was in turn named for Admiral John Winslow, the Civil War commander of USS Kearsarge. A cellar hole in the park’s picnic area is all that remains of the hotel. The site became a state park in 1935.

Greenway
The park is on the Sunapee-Ragged-Kearsarge Greenway, a  loop trail that also passes Rollins State Park, Mount Sunapee State Park, and Wadleigh State Park, as well as Gile, Kearsarge and Shadow Hill state forests and the Bog Mountain Wildlife Management Area.

Notes

References

External links
Winslow State Park New Hampshire Department of Natural and Cultural Resources

State parks of New Hampshire
Parks in Merrimack County, New Hampshire
Wilmot, New Hampshire